Marlene Hassan Nahon (born 1976) is a Gibraltarian historian, journalist and politician, currently serving as a member of the Gibraltar Parliament since 2015.

Biography 
Hassan Nahon is daughter of the late Chief Minister Sir Joshua Abraham Hassan and his second wife, Marcelle Bensimon, both Jews of Moroccan and Portuguese origin. Her sister, Fleur Hassan-Nahoum, is a Barrister and current Deputy Mayor of Jerusalem. She has a BA in History of Art and Architecture from the University of Manchester. She also holds a postgraduate diploma in journalism from the London School of Journalism.

Political career
After the death of minister Charles Bruzon, Hassan Nahon announced her candidacy for the Gibraltar Social Democrats (GSD) in the by-election of 4 July 2013. In a press conference, she stated that she didn't have an agenda (besides the desire to contribute positively to Gibraltar), and said that she was "disappointed" with the policies of the ruling party (the GSLP) and willing to change the composition of Parliament, where there is an "overwhelming number of lawyers" representing both groups of parties. Hassan Nahon received 39.95% of the total votes cast, but was not elected.

Member of the Parliament of Gibraltar
For the thirteenth election of the Parliament of Gibraltar, Hassan Nahon ran for a seat, resulting in her being elected on 26 November 2015 for the period starting on 9 December 2015 and ending in 2019. On 19 May 2016, she resigned from the Gibraltar Social Democrats, alluding to "toxic" tensions within the party; she decided to continue as a member of the parliament, albeit as an independent.

On 15 September 2016, during a heated exchange of words in Parliament, the Minister of Justice, Gilbert Licudi, swore at Hassan Nahon repeatedly while the microphone was off, but still clearly audible. The Gibraltar Women's Association, represented by the committee member Zohra El Gharbaoui, questioned the lack of attention to this matter by the Gibraltarian government, adding that this was beyond a gender issue, a "complete lack of respect for a fellow MP". On 23 September Licudi issued a public apology to MP Hassan-Nahon.

In 2017 Hassan Nahon launched her movement, Together Gibraltar, a grassroots civil society platform. In November 2018, the movement democratically voted to transition into a political party. On 24 September 2019, the party entered the Gibraltar General Elections.

Together Gibraltar finished with an unprecedented result at the General Elections, with party leader Hassan Nahon achieving the most votes in the Opposition Benches. Together Gibraltar received 21% of the overall votes, coming only 3% behind the current official Opposition. Hassan Nahon was a vocal critic of the Gibraltar government's handling of the British withdrawal from the European Union. As a result, she was subject of attacks, many anti-Semitic in nature.

References

External links 
 The Governor, the Chief Minister, the Mayor and Colonialism
 Twitter

Living people
1976 births
21st-century British women politicians
Alumni of the London School of Journalism
Alumni of the University of Manchester
Gibraltar Social Democrats politicians
Gibraltarian Sephardi Jews
Gibraltarian people of Moroccan-Jewish descent
Gibraltarian people of Spanish-Jewish descent
Gibraltarian women in politics
Jewish British politicians
Jewish Gibraltarian politicians
British political party founders
Jewish women politicians